The Los Angeles Charger Girls were the National Football League cheerleading squad that represented the National Football League team Los Angeles Chargers.

History
The Charger Girls performed a variety of dance routines during home games. The squad was founded in 1990, and is managed by e2k Event and Entertainment, which also manages the Los Angeles Clippers, Sacramento Kings, and San Francisco 49ers Gold Rush dance teams. Members serve as ambassadors for the Chargers. The squad also makes non-game appearances. The group releases an annual swimsuit calendar. The group also has a Junior Charger Girls squad, with each performer being required to raise $175 in sponsor funds, with the funds going straight to the Make-A-Wish Foundation and Chargers Community Foundation. 

The group was disbanded in 2021 for financial reasons.

Notable members
Charisma Carpenter (1991), actress, played Cordelia Chase on Buffy the Vampire Slayer and had the same role in the long-lived spin-off Angel
Kara Kay, contestant of Survivor: David vs. Goliath, at the time the club was based in San Diego

Gallery

References

External links

 
 

Los Angeles Chargers
National Football League cheerleading squads
1990 establishments in California
Performing groups established in 1990
2021 disestablishments in California
History of women in California